The 1997 Webster's World Matchplay was the fourth time the World Matchplay darts tournament had been held in the Empress Ballroom at the Winter Gardens, Blackpool between 28 July–2 August 1997.

Two Preliminary round ties were decided even before the players could even reach the oche, with the USA's Larry Butler and Holland's Raymond Barneveld being disqualified for failing to arrive at the venue in enough time to play their rivals, allowing Dean Allsop and Mick Manning an easy passage to the first round.

This was brewery Samuel Webster's third and final year as tournament sponsor. The tournament was won by Phil Taylor.

Prize money
The prize fund was £46,000.

Seeds

Results

Preliminary round

Last 32

Third place playoff (best of 21 legs)  (4) Rod Harrington 11–10 Richie Burnett

References

World Matchplay (darts)
World Matchplay Darts